James Muirhead (21 September 1953 - 17 October 2021) was a British Paralympic swimmer who won thirteen medals at the Summer Paralympic Games. His Paralympic debut was at the 1976 Summer Paralympics where he won two gold medals and two silvers. Muirhead repeated that feat in Arnhem for the 1980 Games, albeit in different events. He returned from the 1984 Summer Paralympics with a fifth gold, another silver, and three bronze medals.

Muirhead lost his sight at age 17. He qualified and worked as a physiotherapist.

He died of cancer in October 2021. He is still the most decorated Scottish paralympic swimmer of all time.

References

1953 births
Living people
Paralympic swimmers of Great Britain
British blind people
Place of birth missing (living people)
Paralympic gold medalists for Great Britain
Paralympic silver medalists for Great Britain
Paralympic bronze medalists for Great Britain
British physiotherapists
Medalists at the 1976 Summer Paralympics
Medalists at the 1980 Summer Paralympics
Medalists at the 1984 Summer Paralympics
Paralympic medalists in swimming
Swimmers at the 1976 Summer Paralympics
Swimmers at the 1980 Summer Paralympics
Swimmers at the 1984 Summer Paralympics
British male freestyle swimmers
British male backstroke swimmers
British male butterfly swimmers
20th-century British people